The BL 8 inch guns Mark I to  Mark VII were the first generations of British rifled breechloaders of medium-heavy calibre. They were initially designed for gunpowder propellants and were of both 25.5 and 30 calibres lengths.

History
Mks I and II were several early proof guns that did not enter British service and Mk V was not made. Limited numbers of 25.5 and 30 calibres guns were produced.

By 1885 the Royal Navy abandoned the 8-inch gun in favour of the 9.2 inch and later the 7.5 inch gun for cruisers, until 1923 when the restrictions of the Washington Naval Treaty led Britain to develop the Mk VIII 8-inch gun in order to arm heavy cruisers with the largest gun allowed by the Treaty.

In the interim Elswick Ordnance continued to develop 8-inch guns in 40 calibre and 45-calibre lengths for export, mainly to Japan.

Mark III
Mk III were low-powered 25-calibres guns mounted on :
  as re-gunned in 1885

Mark IV
Mk IV were 30-calibres guns mounted in :
 Mersey-class cruisers of 1885

Mark VI
Mk VI were 30 calibres guns mounted in :

Mark VII
Mk VII were lighter 25-calibres low-powered guns firing a lighter 180-pound projectile used to equip Australian colonial navies and Australian and New Zealand coastal defences in response to expected Russian expansionism in the Pacific (The "Russian scares" of the 1880s).

Naval service

Mk VII guns armed the following Australian colonial gun vessels :
 HMQS Gayundah of 1884
 HMCS Protector of 1884
 HMVS Albert of 1884
 HMVS Victoria of 1884

Coast defence gun

Mk VII guns were installed on disappearing mountings in Australia and New Zealand as coast-defence guns during the "Russian scares" of the 1880s. In the event, no Russian invasion occurred and the guns were rarely if ever fired.

Four Mk VII coast defence guns were installed at Singapore in the 1880s-1890s : two atop Mount Serapong and two at Fort Tanjong Katong.

Ammunition

Surviving examples
 Mk VII at North Head, Devonport, New Zealand
 Mk VII at summit of Mount Victoria, Auckland, New Zealand
 An unrestored Mk VII disappearing gun at Fort Jervois, Ripapa Island, New Zealand
 Mk VII at Fort Siloso, Sentosa Island, Singapore See also Photograph at Flickr
 Mk VII at Royal Artillery Museum, Woolwich, London
 A Mk VII gun from 1885 on hydro-pneumatic mounting at Fort Queenscliff, Victoria, Australia
 A pair of Mk VII guns at High Street in Westgarth / Northcote, Victoria, Australia 
• A pair of Mk VII guns at Kangaroo Battery, Rosny, Tasmania, Australia

See also
 List of naval guns
 List of coastal artillery

Notes

References

Bibliography
 Additions to 1890 Manual for Victorian naval forces circa. 1895. HMVS Cerberus website
 Text Book of Gunnery, 1902. LONDON : PRINTED FOR HIS MAJESTY'S STATIONERY OFFICE, BY HARRISON AND SONS, ST. MARTIN'S LANE 
 Tony DiGiulian, 8"/26 (20.3 cm) Mark VII

External links

Handbook for the 8-inch b.l. gun marks VII and VIIa Land service 1899 From State Library of Victoria.
 Instructions for 8 inch Rifled Breech Loading Armstrong Gun and Hydro-Pneumatic Disappearing Carriage Describes Mk VII gun. From Australian National Archives
 Instructions for 8 inch Rifled Breech Loading Armstrong Gun and Naval Carriage and Slide Describes Mk VII gun. From Australian National Archives

Naval guns of the United Kingdom
Coastal artillery
203 mm artillery
Victorian-era weapons of the United Kingdom
Disappearing guns